The 1994 NCAA Division I men's ice hockey tournament involved 12 schools playing in single-elimination play to determine the national champion of men's  NCAA Division I college ice hockey. It began on March 25, 1994, and ended with the championship game on April 2. A total of 11 games were played.

Lake Superior State's 9-1 win in the title game was the largest margin of victory since 1961.

Qualifying teams
The at-large bids and seeding for each team in the tournament were announced after the conference tournaments concluded. The Central Collegiate Hockey Association (CCHA) and Hockey East each had four teams receive a berth in the tournament while the Western Collegiate Hockey Association (WCHA) and the ECAC had two berths.

Game locations
 East Regional – Knickerbocker Arena, Albany, New York
 West Regional – Munn Ice Arena, East Lansing, Michigan
 Frozen Four – Saint Paul Civic Center, Saint Paul, Minnesota

Tournament bracket

Note: * denotes overtime period(s)

Regional Quarterfinals

East Regional

(3) New Hampshire vs. (6) Rensselaer

(4) Wisconsin vs. (5) Western Michigan

West Regional

(3) Massachusetts-Lowell vs. (6) Michigan State

(4) Lake Superior State vs. (5) Northeastern

Regional semifinals

East Regional

(1) Boston University vs. (4) Wisconsin

(2) Harvard vs. (3) New Hampshire

West Regional

(1) Michigan vs. (4) Lake Superior State

(2) Minnesota vs. (3) Massachusetts-Lowell

Frozen Four

National semifinal

(E1) Boston University vs. (W2) Minnesota

(E2) Harvard vs. (W4) Lake Superior State

National Championship

(E1) Boston University vs. (W4) Lake Superior State

All-Tournament team
G: Blaine Lacher (Lake Superior State)
D: Keith Aldridge (Lake Superior State)
D: Steve Barnes (Lake Superior State)
F: Clayton Beddoes (Lake Superior State)
F: Mike Pomichter (Boston University)
F: Sean Tallaire* (Lake Superior State)
* Most Outstanding Player(s)

Record by conference

References

Tournament
NCAA Division I men's ice hockey tournament
NCAA Division I men's ice hockey tournament
NCAA Division I men's ice hockey tournament
NCAA Division I men's ice hockey tournament
NCAA Division I men's ice hockey tournament
NCAA Division I men's ice hockey tournament
20th century in Saint Paul, Minnesota
Ice hockey competitions in Albany, New York
Ice hockey competitions in Michigan
Sports competitions in East Lansing, Michigan
Ice hockey competitions in Saint Paul, Minnesota